The Livernois–Fenkell riot was a racially motivated riot in the summer of 1975 on Livernois Avenue at Chalfonte Avenue, just south of Fenkell Avenue, in Detroit, Michigan.

Riot
The trouble began when Andrew Chinarian, the 39-year-old owner of Bolton's Bar, observed three black youths tampering with his car in the parking lot. He fired a pistol or rifle, fatally wounding 18 year old Obie Wynn. According to some accounts, Wynn was fleeing; according to others, he was approaching Chinarian with what the latter thought was a weapon, it later emerged that Wynn was holding a screwdriver. He died from a gun wound to the back of the head.  Crowds gathered and random acts of vandalism, assault looting and racial fighting along Livernois and Fenkell avenues ensued. Bottles and rocks were thrown at passing cars. 

The second fatality was Marian Pyszko, a 54-year-old dishwasher and a Nazi concentration-camp survivor who had emigrated from Poland in 1958. As he drove home from the bakery/candy-factory where he worked, he was pulled from his car by a group of black youths and beaten to death with a piece of concrete. Ronald Bell Jordan, Raymond Peoples, and Dennis Lindsay were all charged with first-degree murder.  

Police were ordered to avoid the use of deadly force, and indeed, not a shot was fired. The crowd of 700 was dispersed by morning. However, angry crowds and violence reappeared the following night – using a car as a battering ram, the crowd stormed and ransacked Bolton's Bar. 

Detroit mayor Coleman Young then worked to defuse the situation by appearing in person, along with numerous clergy, at the scene of the disturbance. Another key factor was Mayor Young getting every black policeman in the city to police the riot, further defusing the situation.

The damage to property in the Livernois-Fenkell area amounted to tens of thousands of dollars. Fifty-three people were arrested, and ten injuries were recorded (including one firefighter and one police officer).  

CBS News reported an unverified claim that the bar served white patrons only, and noted the 25% unemployment rate as an aggravating factor.

See also
List of riots in Detroit
 List of homicides in Michigan
List of incidents of civil unrest in the United States

Bibliography 
Notes

References 
 - Total pages: 80 
 
 - Total pages: 325 

 - Total pages: 337 

  

1975 in Michigan
1975 crimes in the United States
1975 riots
1975 in Detroit
August 1975 events in the United States
Racially motivated violence against European Americans
Racially motivated violence in the United States
African-American riots in the United States
Riots and civil disorder in Detroit
Lynching deaths in the United States